Thermoplasma acidophilum is an archaeon, the type species of its genus. T. acidophilum was originally isolated from a self-heating coal refuse pile, at pH 2 and 59 °C. Its genome has been sequenced.

The size of a cell is about 1 μm. T. acidophilum lacks a cell wall and the cell membrane is exposed directly outside. T. acidophilum shows various cell shapes depending upon growth conditions and stages.

The full genome of Thermoplasma acidophilum has been sequenced. It is only 1565 kb in size.

See also
Thermoplasma volcanium

References

Further reading

External links

LPSN
Type strain of Thermoplasma acidophilum at BacDive -  the Bacterial Diversity Metadatabase

Archaea described in 1970
Euryarchaeota